Hasanabad-e Margemari (also Romanized as Ḩasanābād-e Margemārī; also known as Ḩasanābād and Ḩasanābād-e Mārmeh) is a village in Banaruiyeh Rural District, Banaruiyeh District, Larestan County, Fars Province, Iran. At the 2006 census, its population was 378, in 85 families.

References 

Populated places in Larestan County